Dejan Zečević (born 1 February 1972) is a Serbian film director and screenwriter. In 1997 he graduated from Academy of Performing Arts Belgrade in film and TV directing.

His films have won over 30 awards so far.

Filmography as director
 Paket aranžman (Noć bez sna) (1995)
 Dečak iz Junkovca (1995)
 Kupi mi Eliota (1998)
 T.T. Sindrom (2002)
 Mala noćna muzika (2002)
 Prekidamo program (2002) (TV)
 Dobre namere (2003) (TV)
 Mentol bombona (2004) (TV series)
 Košarkaši (2005) (TV series)
 The Fourth Man (2007)
 The Enemy (2011)
 Offenders (2017)

External links
 
  News about Dejan Zečević on film magazine 

1972 births
Living people
Film people from Belgrade
Serbian film directors